Port Keats Airfield  is an airport at Wadeye, Northern Territory (Port Keats) in Australia.

World War II
During World War II, the airfield was used as an emergency landing ground for Royal Australian Air Force fighters and bombers returning from flying operations over the Netherlands East Indies.

See also
 List of airports in the Northern Territory

References

Airports in the Northern Territory